One-Punch Man is a Japanese anime series based on the webcomic created by One and its subsequent manga adaptation illustrated by Yusuke Murata. The series was directed by Shingo Natsume at Madhouse and was written by Tomohiro Suzuki. The series also features character design by Chikashi Kubota, who also served as chief animation director, and music by Makoto Miyazaki. The series aired from October 5 to December 21, 2015 and was simulcast by Daisuki and Hulu.


Episode list

Notes

References

One-Punch Man episode lists
2015 Japanese television seasons